Hofors AIF is a Swedish football club located in Hofors.

Background

Hofors Allmänna Idrottsförening is a sports club from Hofors in Gästrikland and was formed in 1924.  The club specialises in football, track and field and skiing. In the past the club has also participated in orienteering, bandy and swimming. The club's top athlete was middle distance runner Olle Åberg who took part in the Olympics in 1952 and set numerous world records.

Hofors AIF currently plays in Division 4 Gestrikland which is the sixth tier of Swedish football. Between 1940/41 and 1942/43 the club played three seasons in the Second Division which at that time was second tier of the Swedish football league system. They play their home matches at the Stålringen in Hofors.

The club is affiliated to Gestriklands Fotbollförbund. Hofors AIF have competed in the Svenska Cupen on 17 occasions and have played 37 matches in the competition. In the 1950 Svenska Cupen they reached the quarter-finals of the competition before going down 1–6 at home to AIK before 3,090 spectators.

Season to season

In their most successful period Hofors AIF competed in the following divisions:

In recent seasons Hofors AIF have competed in the following divisions:

Footnotes

External links
 Hofors AIF – Official website
 Hofors AIF on Facebook

Sport in Gävleborg County
Football clubs in Gävleborg County
Association football clubs established in 1924
Bandy clubs established in 1924
1924 establishments in Sweden
Defunct bandy clubs in Sweden